"Something More" is the second single from Train's second album, Drops of Jupiter. The music video for the song was originally to be directed by Nick Brandt, who had completed it, but it was deemed inappropriate by the band's label after the 9/11 attacks due to it being shot around a skyscraper. The second music video was directed by Marc Smerling, his second of three Train music videos, and took place in an Arizona desert.

Track listing

2001 Australia Single
"Something More" (pop mix)
"I Wish You Would" (live)
"Eggplant" (live)
"Free" (live)

2001 European Single
"Something More" (album version)
"Drops of Jupiter (Tell Me)" (live)
"I Wish You Would" (live)
"Eggplant" (live)

Charts

References

2001 singles
Train (band) songs
Song recordings produced by Brendan O'Brien (record producer)
Rock ballads
2001 songs
Columbia Records singles